Corymbia abergiana, commonly known as range bloodwood or Rockingham Bay bloodwood, is a species of tree that is endemic to Queensland. It has rough bark on the trunk and larger branches, smooth bark on the smaller branches, lance-shaped adult leaves, flower buds in groups of seven, creamy white flowers and barrel-shaped fruit with a very thick rim.

Description
It has tessellated, coarsely fibrous, grey-brown to red-brown, bark on the trunk and larger branches, smooth greyish brown bark that is shed in small flakes on the smaller branches. The seeds are dull to semi-glossy red-brown with a terminal wing.

Taxonomy and naming
The range bloodwood was first formally described in 1878 by Ferdinand von Mueller who gave it the name Eucalyptus abergiana and published the description in his book, Fragmenta Phytographiae Australiae. In 1995, Ken Hill and Lawrie Johnson changed the name to Corymbia abergiana. The specific epithet (abergiana) honours Ernst Åberg.

Distribution and habitat
Eucalyptus abergiana grows in forest on hills and gentle slopes in near-coastal areas of North Queensland from near Mareeba to near Paluma.

Conservation status
This eucalypt is classified as "least concern" under the Queensland Government Nature Conservation Act 1992.

See also
List of Corymbia species

References

External links
 

abergiana
Myrtales of Australia
Flora of Queensland
Plants described in 1878
Taxa named by Ferdinand von Mueller